The 1980–81 Toronto Maple Leafs season was the Toronto Maple Leafs 64th season of the franchise, 54th season as the Maple Leafs.

Offseason

NHL Draft

Regular season

Final standings

Playoffs
The Maple Leafs qualified for the playoffs as one of the top sixteen teams. In the preliminary round, the Maple Leafs faced the New York Islanders, the eventual Stanley Cup champion. The Maple Leafs were swept in three games.

Awards and honors

Schedule and results

Player statistics

Regular season
Scoring

Goaltending

Playoffs
Scoring

Goaltending

Transactions
The Maple Leafs have been involved in the following transactions during the 1980-81 season.

Trades

Waivers

Free agents

References

External links
 Maple Leafs on Hockey Database

Toronto Maple Leafs seasons
Toronto Maple Leafs season, 1980-81
Toronto
Toronto Maple Leafs
Toronto Maple Leafs